Glade may refer to:

Places in the United States
Glade, Kansas, a city in Phillips County
Glade, Ohio, an unincorporated community in Jackson County
Glades County, Florida, in south central Florida
Glade Spring, Virginia, a town in Washington County
Glade Township, Warren County, Pennsylvania

Other uses
Glades (band), an Australian indie group formed in 2015
Glade (brand), air freshener products
Glade (geography), open area in woodland, synonym for "clearing"
Glade Festival, an annual electronic dance music festival in England
Glade Interface Designer, a GUI designer for GTK+ and GNOME
Glade skiing, skiing amongst trees
The Glade (magazine), a UK archery quarterly
Up from the Ashes (song), song by rapper Kanye West

See also
The Glades (disambiguation)